Hexaptilona is a genus of tephritid  or fruit flies in the family Tephritidae.

References

Blepharoneurinae
Tephritidae genera